Albert H. Evans was a Welsh professional footballer who played as a wing half or inside forward. He made over 20 appearances in the Football League for Cardiff City.

References

Date of death missing
Footballers from Cardiff
Welsh footballers
Cardiff City F.C. players
Dundalk F.C. players
English Football League players
Association football wing halves
Association football inside forwards
Year of birth missing